Vyshnia, (the former name – Benkova Vyshnia – is a selo (village) in Sambir Raion, Lviv Oblast (province) of western Ukraine. It belongs to Rudky urban hromada, one of the hromadas of Ukraine. 
The population of the village is about 1819 people,  and local government is administered by Vyshnianska village council.

Geography 

History and Attractions 
The first written record of the village dates from 1438. In the 18th century these lands belonged to the family Urbanski. Fredro family had settled in the village Bieńkowa Wisznia in 1797.
In the village is an architectural monument of local importance of Horodok Raion, Lviv Oblast. It is a wooden Church of Saints Cosmas and Damian (1805).

Until 18 July 2020, Vyshnia belonged to Horodok Raion. The raion was abolished in July 2020 as part of the administrative reform of Ukraine, which reduced the number of raions of Lviv Oblast to seven. The area of Horodok Raion was merged into Lviv Raion, however, Vyshnia was transferred to Sambir Raion.

Famous people 
Aleksander Fredro lived on the family estate in the Benkova Vyshnia.

References

External links 
 Барбара Лясоцка-Пшоняк/З історії Бенькової Вишні 
 weather.in.ua/ Vyshnia

Literature 
 Історія міст і сіл УРСР : Львівська область, Городоцький район, Вишня. – К. : ГРУРЕ, 1968 р. Page 257 

Villages in Sambir Raion